The Spirit Music Jamia: Dance of the Infidel is the sixth album by the American multi-instrumentalist Me'shell Ndegeocello, initially released in France on Universal France on February 14, 2005, and then subsequently on the Shanachie label in the United States on June 21 of the same year (see 2005 in music).

The album is Ndegeocello's first after leaving Maverick Records, her label between 1993 and 2003. The album is completely jazz-based and features a number of noted jazz musicians.

The album peaked at #4 on Billboard'''s Top Contemporary Jazz Albums chart in the U.S.

Track listing
"Mu Min" – 1:54
"Al Falaq 13" – 11:47
"Aquarium" – 4:43
Featuring Sabina Sciubba
"Papillon" – 11:32
"Dance Of The Infidel" – 7:27
"The Chosen" – 6:34
Featuring Cassandra Wilson
"Luqman" – 11:55
"Heaven" – 6:07
Featuring Lalah Hathaway

Personnel
Me'shell Ndegeocello – multi-instrumentalist, arranger, producer, art direction
Brandon Ross – guitar
Michael Cain – piano, arranger, keyboards
Neal Evans – piano, keyboards
Federico Gonzalez Peña – keyboards
Didi Gutman – keyboards, programming
Ron Blake – horn
Don Byron – horn
Wallace Roney – horn
Josh Roseman – horn
Oran Coltrane – horn
Oliver Lake – horn
Kenny Garrett – horn
Grégoire Maret – harmonica
Chris Dave – drums
Jack DeJohnette – drums
Gene Lake – drums
Dan Reiser – clay drums
Pedro Martinez – percussion
Yosvany Terry – percussion
Mino Cinelu – percussion
Lalah Hathaway – vocals
Cassandra Wilson – vocals
Sabina Sciubba – vocals
Matt Garrison – bass guitar
Dave Meshell – bass, programming
Takuya Nakamura – programming
Bob Power – producer, engineer, mixing
Ari Raskin – programming, engineer, mixing
Zeke Zima – engineer
Emily Lazar – mastering
William Miller – production assistant
Brian Montgomery – assistant
Ross Petersen – assistant
David Swope – assistant
Dexter Story – management
Marsha Black – administration
Kofi Taha – executive producer
Jason Olaine – A&R
Rebecca Meek – artwork, art direction, package design

External links
 Meshell's New 'Dance' at Billboard''

2005 albums
Meshell Ndegeocello albums
Universal Music France albums